Mónika Bartos (born 24 December 1975) is a Hungarian politician, member of the National Assembly (MP) from Regional List of Hajdú-Bihar County between 2010 and 2014, and the Fidesz–KDNP national list since 2014.

She was appointed a member of the Committee on Sustainable Development on 14 May 2010, serving in this capacity until 7 May 2018. Following that she became vice-chairperson of the Committee on Budgets.

References

1975 births
Living people
Fidesz politicians
Members of the National Assembly of Hungary (2010–2014)
Members of the National Assembly of Hungary (2014–2018)
Members of the National Assembly of Hungary (2018–2022)
Members of the National Assembly of Hungary (2022–2026)
Women members of the National Assembly of Hungary
Politicians from Budapest
21st-century Hungarian women politicians